Miraglia is a surname. Notable people with the surname include:

Corrado Miraglia (1821–1881), Italian operatic tenor 
Emilio Miraglia (born 1924), Italian film director
Luigi Miraglia, Italian latinist and classicist
Mauro Miraglia (born 1997), Argentine footballer 
Túlio Miraglia (born 1930), Brazilian sports shooter